Rouxville Commando was a light infantry regiment of the South African Army. It formed part of the South African Army Infantry Formation as well as the South African Territorial Reserve.

History

Origin

With the Orange Free State Republic
Rouxville Commando was with General de Wet during the battle of Sanna's Post outside Bloemfontein when seven guns and 117 wagons were captured from the British.

See: Battle of Sanna's Post

With the UDF
By 1902 all Commando remnants were under British military control and disarmed.

By 1912, however previous Commando members could join shooting associations.

By 1940, such commandos were under control of the National Reserve of Volunteers.

These commandos were formally reactivated by 1948.

With the SADF
During this era, the unit was mainly involved in area force protection, cordones and search operations assisting the local police and stock theft control.

With the SANDF

Amalgamation
By 1997, Rouxville Commando amalgamated with Zastron Commando.

Disbandment
This combined unit, along with all other Commando units was disbanded after a decision by South African President Thabo Mbeki to disband all Commando Units. The Commando system was phased out between 2003 and 2008 "because of the role it played in the apartheid era", according to the Minister of Safety and Security Charles Nqakula.

Leadership 

 Commandant J.H. Olivier 1899
 Commandant P.H. Kritzinger 1900

References

See also 
 South African Commando System

Infantry regiments of South Africa
South African Commando Units